Burning London: The Clash Tribute is a tribute album to the English punk rock band The Clash. It was released in 1999.  A portion of the proceeds from the sales of Burning London will benefit the High Risk Youth Program of the Children's Hospital Los Angeles.

Track listing

References

External links 
 Neva Chonin, Aidin Vaziri, Colin Berry, Gary Graff, David Wiegand, Dan Ouellette, Amanda Nowinski (2 May 1999). "`Burning London' Proves A Worthy Homage to the Clash". Collection. SFGate.
 Keith Phipps (19 April 2002). "Burning London: The Clash Tribute". Review. The A.V. Club.
 Scott Schinder (May 1999). "Review of Burning London: The Clash Tribute". Pulse.

The Clash tribute albums
Albums produced by David Kahne
1999 compilation albums
Epic Records compilation albums
Punk rock compilation albums